A blocking statute is a law of one jurisdiction intended to hinder application there of a law made by a foreign jurisdiction. A blocking statute was proposed by the European Union in 1996 to nullify a US trade embargo on Cuba and sanctions related to Iran and Libya which affected countries trading with the US and with the named countries. The 1996 statute was not enacted as the disagreements were settled by other means.

A blocking statute shields companies in its jurisdiction against sanctions by prohibiting them from respecting the sanctions, and not recognising foreign court rulings enforcing them.

European Union blocking statute
A EU blocking statute was originally enacted in 1996 to "counteract" the sanctions imposed by the United States against Cuba, Iran and Libya.

After the US reimposed sanctions against Iran following its withdrawal from an agreement which permitted trade if Iran curtailed its nuclear programme, on 17 May 2018 the European Commission announced its intention to implement the blocking statute of 1996 to declare the US sanctions against Iran null and void in Europe and ban European citizens and companies from complying with them. The Commission also instructed the European Investment Bank to facilitate European companies' investment in Iran.

2018 update
On 7 August 2018, the EU updated its blocking statute. The process of updating the EU blocking statute commenced by adding to its scope on 6 June 2018 the extraterritorial sanctions the US re-imposed on Iran. The European Commission said:

The 2018 blocking statute essentially prohibits EU companies from "direct" or "indirect" (via subsidiaries or intermediary persons) compliance with the laws listed in US sanctions annex. It also does not recognize any verdicts by courts that enforce US penalties. A to-be-established clearing house will, through a special-purpose vehicle set up for this purpose, facilitate trade with Iran by European companies, bypassing US sanctions.

European governments regard the blocking statute as "more of a political weapon than a regulation", since, it wrote, the blocking statute's rules were "vague and difficult to enforce". A senior US administration official said they were not "particularly concerned by" the imposition of the blocking statute.

References

External links
 Council Regulation (EC) No 2271/96 of 22 November 1996 protecting against the effects of the extra-territorial application of legislation adopted by a third country, and actions based thereon or resulting therefrom
 Blocking statute; Protecting EU operators, reinforcing European strategic autonomy

International law